English medieval pottery was produced in Britain from the sixth to the late fifteen centuries AD.
During the sixth to the eighth centuries, pottery was handmade locally and fired in a bonfire. Common pottery fabrics consisted of clay tempered with sand or shell, or a mix of sand and shell.  Pottery forms were common items used for cooking and storage, and were undecorated or decorated simply with incised lines.  By the eighth century, the slow wheel was being used by local craftsmen to finish pots. By the late ninth century, potters in urban areas started to mass-produce their products. A larger variety of forms were being made and decorated in new ways. During the tenth century, potters began transitioning to a fast wheel and firing pots in kilns. Grooved lines, thumbed-applied strips, stamping and rouletting were commonly used decorations.  From the thirteenth to the fifteenth centuries, glazed and slip pottery appeared more frequently in the marketplace, along with new fabric colours and decorations, and a large number of new forms.

List of English medieval pottery 
This is a partial list of English medieval pottery.

Sources

British pottery